Abhilasha Patil (6 April 1974 – 5 May 2021) was an Indian actor who worked in Marathi and Hindi films. She played the role of Raghav's nurse in the 2019-film Chhichhore.

Biography
Patil was born  in Calcutta (present-day Kolkata).

Patil played in the films Te Aath Diwas (2015), Pipsi (2018), Bayko Deta Ka Bayko (2020), Prawaas (2020) and Tujha Majha Arrange Marriage (2021). She also played roles in Hindi films like Badrinath Ki Dulhania (2017), Good Newwz (2019) and Chhichhore (2019).

Patil died on 5 May 2021, from COVID-19, aged 47.

Filmography

Hindi movies
 Badrinath Ki Dulhania (2017)  teacher
 Chhichhore (2019)  Raghav's nurse
 Good Newwz (2019)  air hostess

Marathi movies
 Te Aath Diwas (2015)
 Pipsi (2018)  Kaveri
 Bayko Deta Ka Bayko (2020)
 Prawaas (2020)
 Tujha Majha Arrange Marriage (2021)
 Luckdown Be Positive (2021)

References

1974 births
2021 deaths
21st-century Indian actresses
Indian film actresses
Indian television actresses
Place of birth missing
Place of death missing
Deaths from the COVID-19 pandemic in India
People from Kolkata